Ulsan Museum is a history museum located adjacent to Ulsan Grand Park in Nam-gu, Ulsan, South Korea. The museum has a permanent exhibit that details life in Ulsan and the rest of Korea from prehistoric times to the present. Construction of the museum commenced on 2 January 2009 and was completed on 31 January 2011. It opened on 22 June 2011.

See also 
 History portal
 South Korea portal
 List of museums in South Korea
 List of South Korean tourist attractions
 Jangsaengpo Whale Museum
 Ulsan Science Museum

References

External links 
 Official website 

Natural history museums in South Korea
Nam District, Ulsan
Museums in Ulsan